Chris Koster is a Canadian rock singer, songwriter, and musician, who has been active both as a solo artist and as a member of the band The Glorious Sons.

Career
Chris Koster is an experimental singer-songwriter based in Kingston, Ontario, Canada. With influences said to range from Trent Reznor to The Beatles, his musical style encompasses many genres and moods, from 'soft' pop songs to charged metal numbers. Performing on keyboard, guitar and vocals, Koster continues in the solo artist tradition of the likes of Gary Numan and Prince – self-contained and self-produced.

For his two albums, Secrets of the Lonely and Sex, Love & Morality, Koster played the majority of the instruments; however, he invited his band The Lonely to contribute to a few songs. He toured extensively from 2005 to the present.

He is the brother of Dave "Billy Ray" Koster, a longtime member of the road crew for The Tragically Hip.

Secrets of the Lonely (2004)
Koster's first album, on The Orange Record Label, was recorded and self-produced at The Tragically Hip's studio in Loyalist, Ontario, Ontario.

Track listing
All songs written by Chris Koster, except where noted:
"Camouflage" – 4:04
"Catastrophizing" – 3:37
"If U See Me (When I'm Like This" – 3:53
"Wartime Romance" – 4:25
"The Alarmist (Don't Worry)" – 4:59
"Love In The Western World" – 4:08
"Sufferville" – 5:44
"Honestly" – 2:17
"When U Were Mine" (Prince) – 4:58
"Secrets of the Lonely" – 4:57
"In This Life" – 3:13
"Sincerity Blues" – 1:01
"Mary Ann" – 4:13
"I Don't Care (Anymore)" – 4:08
"In This Life" – 6:05

Credits
The album credits are as follows:
Chris Koster – Lyricist
Lindsey Hilliard – Violin
Michael Olsen – Cello
Aaron Holmberg – Producer
Mark Makowy – Producer
Byron Wong – Producer, Photography, Processing

Sex, Love & Morality (2008)
Sex, Love & Morality, with its first single "Heavy Hearted" on The Orange Record Label in October 2007, was Koster's second album. The music is granular, complex and multi-layered but also remarkably accessible and memorable. One reason for this progression was his relationship with producer Bob Ezrin. "He helped me hone my craft," says Koster, "he really pushed me to do something different and challenged me".

References

External links
 Chris Koster Official Website

Year of birth missing (living people)
Living people
Canadian rock singers
Canadian male songwriters
Musicians from Kingston, Ontario
Writers from Kingston, Ontario
Canadian rock guitarists
Canadian male guitarists